John Saltmarsh (born East Riding,  Yorkshire, d. 1647) was an English religious radical, "One of the most gentle tongued of controversialists", writer and preacher. He supported the Covenant and was chaplain in Thomas Fairfax's army. The Dictionary of National Biography describes his theology as "Calvinistic in its base, but improved by practical knowledge of men". William Haller called him that strange genius, part poet and part whirling dervish. He preached Free Grace theology, and published on the topics of Peace, Love and Unity.

Life
Saltmarsh matriculated Magdalene College, Cambridge in 1627,  receiving a B.A. in 1633 and his M.A. in 1636. Having graduated from Cambridge he was ordained deacon at Durham in 1637 and rector of Heslerton circa 1637, where he remained until 1643. Holy discoveries and flames was published in 1640 and is dedicated to Charles I, inspired by the aesthetics of George Herbert.From 1641 Saltmarsh is thought to have begun incorporating notions of Free Grace theology into his sermons.

Departing from Heslerton in 1643 Saltmarsh took parish in Northampton, then  Cranbrook in Kent. In July 1643 Saltmarsh heard Royalist churchman Thomas Fuller preach at The Savoy and responded to Fuller's views on ecclesiastical reform by publishing Examinations, or, A discovery of some dangerous positions delivered in A sermon of reformation preached in the church of the Savoy last fast day July 26 by Tho. Fuller, B.D.', which Fuller replied to a few months later in August. In the same month Saltmarsh's notions of how conflict could be resolved between King and Parliament were vocally supported in Parliament by Henry Marten with such strength of conviction Marten was evicted from the Commons and imprisoned in the Tower of London. In September Saltmarsh published A peace but no pacification, or, An answer to that new designe of the oath of pacification and accommodation lately printed a subject for all that love true peace and liberty to consider in response to The Oath of Pacification by Henry Parker, Saltmarsh opposing hasty accommodation by Parliament of royalists and the king.

In 1645 Saltmarsh was placed by the parliamentary Committee for Plundered Ministers in Brasted, Kent. Whilst at Brasted Saltmarsh refused his annual stipendiary, believing tithes unchristian, a matter he would raise in his pamphlet dispute with fellow clergyman John Ley in 1646. During Saltmarsh's time at Brasted lay administration of sacraments and a woman preacher were noted, suggesting Saltmarsh was espousing, or at least facilitating, less than orthodox ideas within his parish.

Thomas Fairfax enlisted Saltmarsh as Army chaplain in the New Model Army from January 1646 and he was kept in pay by the army until November of 1647. There lacks sufficient evidence to gauge the extent of Saltmarsh's influence within the Army but Saltmarsh was certainly recruited for being exceptional, rather than traditional, in his approach. he was assigned no fixed regiment, preaching both to Fairfax personally and his train.
Saltmarsh appears to have shared ideological views with William Dell, also a Chaplain in Fairfax's Army,  the two clergymen are reported as having preached together on at least one occasion. Salt marsh's rhetoric is laced with Irenicism and soteriological ideas, he was often accused of Antinomianism Saltmarsh resolutely denied association with Antinomian ideals. Saltmarsh published consistently on Free Grace and 'Unitie, Peace, Love' throughout 1646 and 1647. Saltmarsh engaged in popular print discourse with Richard Baxter, Thomas Gataker and Thomas Edwards. Edwards responded to Saltmarsh in his second volume of Gangraena.

During a period of intensified preaching and print propaganda, when political debate entered the public sphere and protestations of correctitude were the norm, often widening the divide rather than bridging it with insight. John Saltmarsh noted the “intemperacy, and unnaturall heats”  and begins addressing the division directly, “I saw so many plunged in the controversys of our times, that it had been good some of them were well out, or had never come in, for the disputes which before warmed us, have now set us all on flame”. Saltmarsh outlines the importance of “free” and “peaceably bold” discussion, seeing the soul as “more at liberty for debating” than when limitations are placed upon expression. He endeavours not to preach determinate and conclusive ideals, yet not to preach what is popular, instead he relays the openings he is prompted to, from the truth he receives directly via God, "God’s own notion".

Immediately after George Joyce seized King Charles I in 1647 Saltmarsh published a "Letter from the Army" defending Fairfax and the Army's actions, he also refuted having become involved in political matters "I never made state-business any Pulpit work, I never yet preached anything but Christ Saltmarsh was not present at the Putney Debates in October 1647 but wrote to the Council of War on October 28th exhorting them to righteous conclusion.

On December 4th of the same year Saltmarsh informed his wife, Mary, he had received a vision from God which the must deliver to the Army. He rode from his home in  Ilford, Essex, to London, then to army headquarters at Windsor where he spoke both to Cromwell and Fairfax, without removing his hat, where he resigned his position as Army Chaplain, stating he could not honour them due to their imprisoning of the Levellers arrested at Corkbush Field. Saltmarsh conveyed God was angry with them but knew the Army had important work yet to do. Saltmarsh returned home to Laystreet, near Ilford and died just a few days later, on December 11th 1647. He was buried at Wanstead on December 15th. Mary Saltmarsh posthumously published "Englands friend raised from the grave..." in 1648.

Views
He argued strongly for religious toleration and liberty of conscience. He considered that heaven on earth was possible. Samuel Rutherford accused Saltmarsh of antinomianism. Irenicism is evident throughout Saltmarsh's works.  Peter Toon writes

He believed in universal salvation, and agreed with John Bunyan on the lack of necessity for baptism. He also regarded observance of Sunday as the Sabbath  as not required; his Reasons for Unitie, Peace, and Love (1646) states

A controversy with Thomas Fuller  brought forth his pamphlet Examinations. Fuller

Works

"Poemata sacra" (1636)
"The practice of policie in a Christian life taught from the Scriptures" (London: E.G. for Samuel Endarby and are to be sold at his shop at the signe of the Starre in Popes head alley, 1639)
"Holy Discoveries and Flames" (1640)
"Examinations, or, A discovery of some dangerous positions" (1643)
"A Peace but No Pacification'" (1643)
"A solemn discourse upon the grand covenant, opening the divinity and policy of it:" by John Saltmarsh, Master of Arts, and not long since, pastour of Heslerton in Yorkshire. (London: Laurence Blaiklock, 1643)
"New Quaeres of conscience, touching the late oath desiring resolution..." (1643) printed in Oxford for William Webb
"A solemn discourse vpon the sacred league and covenant of both kingdomes, opening the divinity and policy of it" (London: Lawrence Blaiklock, 1644)
"A voice from Heaven: or, The words of a dying minister, Mr. Kayes,:in the county of Kent, at the town of Sundrage, eighteen miles from London, neer Westrum, a market=town in the same county: delivered before those who were then in his chamber severally present to the things he spake, who dyed as he foretold himselfe, the 19. of November, 1644. Master Rogers, Master Rogers his sister, Richard Thomas Yeoman, the wife of Iohn Overy, the wife of one Ford, Master Pain the elder, Master Pain the younger, Mistresse Kaies the sister of Master Kaies, the brother of Master Kaies, Master Saltmarsh minister in the same county, Nicholas Crosse, the son of Master Crosse." Set forth by Iohn Saltmarsh, Preacher of Gods Word in Kent, at Brasteed. (London : Robert White, and are to be sold by Giles Calvert, at the sign of the Spred-Eagle neer the West-end of Pauls, 1644)
"The fountaine of free grace opened by questions and answers::proving the foundation of faith to consist only in Gods free love in giving Christ to dye for the sins of all, and objections to the contrary answered by the Congregation of Christ in London, constituted by baptisme upon the profession of faith, falsely called Anabaptists. Wherein they vindicate themselves from the scandalous aspersions of holding free-will, and denying a free election by grace. (London, 1645)
"The opening of Master Prynnes new book, called A vindication: or, light breaking out from a cloud of differences, or late controversies.: Wherein are inferences upon the Vindication, and antiqueres to the queres; and by that, the way a little cleared to a further discovery of truth in a church-order, by a conference or discourse. (London : G. Calvert, at the signe of the Black Spred-Eagle, at the West-End of S. Pauls (1645)
"Some drops of the viall powred out in a season when it is neither night nor day : or, Some discoveries of Jesus Christ his glory in severall books .. "(London, 1645)
''Dawnings of Light'' (1645)
"The divine right of Presbyterie,: asserted by the present Assembly, and petitioned for accordingly to the Honourable House of Commons in Parliament. With reasons discussing this pretended divine right; and yet with tendernesse to the brethren of the Presbyterial way. Pleading for a liberty of conscience for them in this their opinion, as for others of their dissenting brethren, and equally for both. With inferences upon their late petition." (London : G. Calvert, at the Black Spread-Eagle at the West-end of Pauls, 1646)	
"An end of one controversie:: being an answer or letter to Master Ley's large last book, called Light for smoke. One of the Assembly at Westminster. Which he writ lately against me. In which the sum of his last book, which relates to the most material passages in it, is gathered up and replied to. "(London : Ruth Raworth for G. Calvert, at the signe of the Black Spread-Eagle at the west-end of Paul, 1646)		
 Free grace, or, The flowings of Christs blood free to sinners being an experiment of Jesus Christ upon one who hath been in the bondage of a troubled conscience ... (London : Giles Calvert, 1646)
"A nevv quære at this time seasonably to be considered as we tender the advancement of trvth & peace : viz. whether it be fit, according to the principles of true religion, and state, to settle any church-government over the kingdome hastily, or not : and with the power commonly desired, in the hands of the ministers" (London : Giles Calvert ..., 1646)
''Groanes for Liberty'' (1646)
''Reasons for Unitie, Peace, and Love'' (1646)
''An End of One Controversie'' (1646)
''The Smoke in the Temple'' (1646)
 "Some drops of the viall, powered out in a season when it is neither night nor day, or, Some discoveries of Iesus Christ His glory in severall books ... : all which books are here reprinted in one booke entirely after the severall impressions of them and presented to the reader" (London : Giles Calvert ..., 1646)
''A Letter from the Army'' (1647)
''Sparkles of Glory'' (1647)
"The fountaine of free grace opened by questions and answers proving the foundation of faith to consist only in Gods free love, in giving Christ to dye for the sins of all, and objections to the contrary answered by the congregation of Christ in London, constituted by baptisme upon the profession of faith, falsly called Anabaptists : wherein they vindicate themselves from the scandalous aspersions of holding free-will, and denying a free election by grace. "(London : ReGiles Calvert ..., 1648)
"Englands friend raised from the grave.: Giving seasonable advice to the Lord Generall, Lievtenant-Generall, and the Councell of Warre. Being the true copies of three letters"'' (London : Giles Calvert, at the black Spread-Eagle at the west end of Pauls, 1649)

Notes

External links
Saltmarsh's Book Free Grace
Saltmarsh's Book Sparkles of Glory

1647 deaths
English religious writers
English political writers
English theologians
English Christian universalists
Year of birth unknown
Christian universalist clergy
Christian universalist theologians
People from West Heslerton
17th-century English writers
17th-century English male writers
English male poets
Clergy from Yorkshire